Herston may refer to:
Herston, Dorset, England
Herston, Orkney, Scotland
Herston, Queensland, Australia